Michael Bingham (born 13 April 1986) is a British 400 metres track and field athlete.

He is one of five children born to British citizen Norris Bingham and Mollissie in Sylva, North Carolina. His parents separated when he was young, and he was raised by his mother, attending The McCallie School. Bingham holds the school record in the 100 m, 200 m, 300IH, 4 × 100 m, 4 × 200 m, 4 × 400 m, 110 m hurdles and decathlon.

Bingham studied at Wake Forest University, and after transferring allegiance on April 30, 2008, Bingham was part of the Great Britain 4 × 400 m relay team at the 2008 Summer Olympics, that came 3rd in Beijing. He ran a personal best of 44.74 in the 400 m semi-finals of 2009 World Championships in Athletics, qualifying for the final where he finished 7th. He then won silver with the Great Britain 4 × 400 m relay team with Conrad Williams, Robert Tobin and Martyn Rooney. He was formerly managed by Michael Johnson.

On 9 November 2013, he married Shana Cox, also an American-born sprinter representing Great Britain.

References

External links

Team GB Profile

1986 births
Living people
People from Sylva, North Carolina
Track and field athletes from North Carolina
American male sprinters
British male sprinters
English male sprinters
Olympic male sprinters
Olympic athletes of Great Britain
Olympic bronze medallists for Great Britain
Olympic bronze medalists in athletics (track and field)
Athletes (track and field) at the 2008 Summer Olympics
Medalists at the 2008 Summer Olympics
Commonwealth Games gold medallists for England
Commonwealth Games gold medallists in athletics
Athletes (track and field) at the 2014 Commonwealth Games
World Athletics Championships medalists
World Athletics Indoor Championships medalists
European Athletics Championships winners
European Athletics Championships medalists
European Athletics Indoor Championships winners
British Athletics Championships winners
American people of British descent
Wake Forest University alumni
Commonwealth Games competitors for England
Medallists at the 2014 Commonwealth Games